Dolan Peak is a rock peak,  high, standing  west-northwest of Hendrickson Peak in the northwest part of the Quartz Hills. It was mapped by the United States Geological Survey from surveys and U.S. Navy air photos, 1960–64, and was named by the Advisory Committee on Antarctic Names for Theodore G. Dolan, a glaciologist at Byrd Station, summer 1959–60.

References 

Mountains of Marie Byrd Land